Donald Trump, the 45th president of the United States, has elicited polarized public perceptions about his performance as a head of state and largely negative opinions about his temperament and personal conduct while in office. Before entering politics, he was a businessman and television personality famous for his image as a real estate tycoon. Trump has widely been seen as a business "huckster" and has been the frequent butt of jokes.

Image of wealth and success

Beginning in the 1980s, Trump had a strong presence in tabloid media where he was portrayed as a playboy and an extravagantly wealthy idol of the working class. Political scientist Michael Nelson writes that Trump has cultivated an image as "the epitome of entrepreneurial success and glamour".

Books

Trump has published up to 19 books on business, financial, or political topics under his name.  Trump's first book, The Art of the Deal (1987), was a New York Times Best Seller. According to The New Yorker, "The book expanded Trump's renown far beyond New York City, promoting an image of himself as a successful dealmaker and tycoon."

Trump brand

Trump created a personal brand based on his image as a self-made billionaire real-estate mogul, and he made millions of dollars licensing his name to international hotels, casinos, products, and other ventures.

Personal image

Temperament
During his political career, "Trump's unique personal style, brashness and disregard for conventional political norms and discourse" has won him both supporters and detractors, according to Gallup. Since running for president, Trump's temperament and mental fitness has been a regular topic of public discussion.  Trump has responded by saying that he has "the best temperament" and is a "very stable genius". Americans have mostly disapproved of Trump's temperament and personal conduct in office.

Personal appearance

Hair 

Trump's hairstyle has been mentioned frequently by the media. His hairstyle has been described as a comb-over.

In 2004, the Chicago Tribune wrote that Trump is "known for his gaudy casinos and unusual mane of copper hair." During a 2011 interview with Rolling Stone, Trump said, "I get a lot of credit for comb-overs. But it's not really a comb-over. It's sort of a little bit forward and back. I've combed it the same way for years. Same thing, every time."

In various late-night talk shows and interviews, Trump's hair has humorously been suggested to be a wig, so he has let the interviewers touch his hair to verify its authenticity. In September 2016, Jimmy Fallon invited Donald Trump to be a guest on The Tonight Show Starring Jimmy Fallon. Trump was asked by Fallon if he could mess up his hair. Trump agreed to the offer and allowed Fallon to mess his hair. Following the hair incident, Fallon was accused by critics of humanizing Trump after Trump had pressed more on the zero-tolerance immigration policy under his administration.

In February 2018, a video shot of Trump boarding Air Force One against a gust of wind clearly showed the comb-over. The video went viral and was critiqued on the internet.

Skin color

Comedians and critics of Donald Trump, as well as the media have often remarked on the color of his skin, considering it unusually orange. Comedian Alec Baldwin, who played a satirized version of Donald Trump on Saturday Night Live, described Trump's look as somewhere between "Mark Rothko orange" and a "slightly paler Orange Crush", while in 2013, the American comedian Bill Maher offered to pay $5 million to a charity if Donald Trump would produce his birth certificate to prove that Trump's mother had not mated with an orangutan - apparently a reference to Trump's orange hue as well as a response to Trump's previous demands that President Barack Obama produce his birth certificate and other records to disprove conspiracy theories that Obama was born in Kenya. Trump would go on to file a lawsuit against Maher, claiming the comedian owed the promised $5 million. Eight weeks later, Trump withdrew the lawsuit.

The phrase "Orange man bad" became a popular expression among Trump's supporters who used it to mock his critics, during his first election campaign and subsequent presidency. In 2016, Barack Obama, Trump's African-American predecessor as president, appeared on the Tonight Show with Jimmy Fallon, and joked that "Orange is not the new black" (referencing the popular show Orange Is the New Black). Trump has rarely referenced his orange hue without being prompted to. However, in 2019, in an address to Republican legislators where he discussed the adoption of compact fluorescent light bulbs he said: "The lightbulb. People said: what's with the lightbulb? I said: here's the story. And I looked at it. The bulb that we're being forced to use! Number one, to me, most importantly, the light's no good. I always look orange. And so do you! The light is the worst."

In February 2020, an unverified Twitter account called "White House Photos" posted a photograph of the President, in which Trump's face bore a notable tan line; the image depicted the stark contrast between Trump's seemingly orange facial features and the paler skin around the side of his face; the photograph received widespread attention in the media and on the internet, even inspiring a sketch on Saturday Night Live. Trump himself said the image had been photoshopped.

Popular culture 

Trump has played himself in the role of a rich and powerful businessman in cameo appearances in films and television shows and from 2004 to 2015 as the host of the reality show The Apprentice.

Trump has been the subject of parody, comedy, and caricature. He has been parodied regularly on Saturday Night Live by Phil Hartman, Darrell Hammond, and Alec Baldwin, and in South Park as Mr. Garrison. The Simpsons episode "Bart to the Future"written during his 2000 campaign for the Reform Partyanticipated a Trump presidency. A parody series called The President Show debuted in April 2017 on Comedy Central, while another one called Our Cartoon President debuted on Showtime in February 2018.

Trump's wealth and lifestyle had been a fixture of hip hop lyrics since the 1980s; he was named in hundreds of songs, most often in a positive tone. Mentions of Trump in hip hop turned negative and pejorative after he ran for office in 2015.

Relationship with the press 

Throughout his career, Trump has sought media attention, with a "love-hate" relationship with the press. Trump began promoting himself in the press in the 1970s. Fox News anchor Bret Baier and former House speaker Paul Ryan have characterized Trump as a "troll" who makes controversial statements to see people's "heads explode". According to conservative media watchdog, Media Research Center, 92% of media coverage of the Trump administration portrays him negatively, which has made Trump accuse the mainstream media of bias.

In the 2016 campaign, Trump benefited from a record amount of free media coverage, elevating his standing in the Republican primaries. New York Times writer Amy Chozick wrote in 2018 that Trump's media dominance, which enthralls the public and creates "can't miss" reality television-type coverage, was politically beneficial for him. According to Columbia Journalism Review, "Because Trump entered the presidential stage from the world of business hucksterism and reality TV, he was seen, from the outset, as a less serious contender. In fact, he was treated as a joke." Salena Zito wrote for The Atlantic that "the press takes [Trump] literally, but not seriously; his supporters take him seriously, but not literally."

Throughout his 2016 presidential campaign and his presidency, Trump has accused the press of bias, calling it the "fake news media" and "the enemy of the people". After winning the election, journalist Lesley Stahl recounted Trump's allegedly saying he intentionally demeaned and discredited the media "so when you write negative stories about me no one will believe you."

Trump has privately and publicly mused about revoking the press credentials of journalists he views as critical. His administration moved to revoke the press passes of two White House reporters, which were restored by the courts. In 2019, a member of the foreign press reported many of the same concerns as those of media in the U.S., expressing concern that a normalization process by reporters and media results in an inaccurate characterization of Trump. The Trump White House held about a hundred formal press briefings in 2017, declining by half during 2018 and to two in 2019.

Trump has employed the legal system as an intimidation tactic against the press. In early 2020, the Trump campaign sued The New York Times, The Washington Post, and CNN for alleged defamation. These lawsuits lacked merit and were not likely to succeed, however.

Political image

Approval ratings 

At the end of Trump's second year, his two-year average Gallup approval rating was the lowest of any president since World War II. In January 2020, his Gallup rating reached 49%, the highest point since he took office, with 63% of those polled approving his handling of the economy. His approval and disapproval ratings have been unusually stable. In 2019 Gallup found Trump to be the most polarizing president to date.

In Gallup's end-of-year poll asking Americans to name the man they admire the most, Trump placed second to Obama in 2017 and 2018, tied with Obama in 2019, and placed first in 2020. Since Gallup started conducting the poll in 1948, Trump is the first elected president not to be named most admired in his first year in office.

Globally, a Gallup poll on 134 countries comparing the approval ratings of U.S. leadership between the years 2016 and 2017 found that only in 29 of them did Trump lead Obama in job approval. Overall ratings were similar to those in the last two years of the George W. Bush presidency.

Social media 

Trump's presence on social media has attracted attention worldwide since he joined Twitter in March 2009. He frequently tweeted during the 2016 election campaign and has continued to do so as president. As of October 2020, Trump has more than 85 million Twitter followers.

By the end of May 2020, Trump had written about 52,000 tweets. These include 22,115 tweets over seven years before his presidential candidacy, 8,159 tweets during the  years of his candidacy and transition period, and 14,186 tweets over the first three years of his presidency.

Trump has frequently used Twitter as a direct means of communication with the public. A White House press secretary said early in his presidency that Trump's tweets are official statements by the president of the United States, employed for announcing policy or personnel changes. Trump used Twitter to fire Secretary of State Rex Tillerson in March 2018 and Secretary of Defense Mark Esper in November 2020.

Many of Trump's tweets contain false assertions.
In May 2020, Twitter began tagging some Trump tweets with fact-checking warnings and labels for violations of Twitter rules. Trump responded by threatening to "strongly regulate" or "close down" social media platforms.

False statements 

As president, Trump has frequently made false statements in public speeches and remarks. The misinformation has been documented by fact-checkers; academics and the media have widely described the phenomenon as unprecedented in American politics. This behavior was similarly observed when he was a presidential candidate. His falsehoods have also become a distinctive part of his political identity.

Trump uttered "at least one false or misleading claim per day on 91 of his first 99 days" in office, according to The New York Times, and 1,318 total in his first 263 days in office, according to the "Fact Checker" political analysis column of The Washington Post. By the Posts tally, it took Trump 601 days to reach 5,000 false or misleading statements and another 226 days to reach the 10,000 mark. For the seven weeks leading up to the midterm elections, it rose to an average of thirty per day from 4.9 during his first hundred days in office. The Posts reported tally is 22,247 as of August 27, 2020, with the 2019 total more than double the cumulative total of 2017 and 2018.

Some of Trump's falsehoods are inconsequential, such as his claims of a large crowd size during his inauguration. Others have had more far-reaching effects, such as Trump's promotion of unproven antimalarial drugs as a treatment for COVID‑19 in a press conference and on Twitter in March 2020. The claims had consequences worldwide, such as a shortage of these drugs in the United States and panic-buying in Africa and South Asia. The state of Florida obtained nearly a million doses for its hospitals, even though most of them did not want the drug. Other misinformation, such as Trump's retweet of unverified videos of a far-right British nationalist group in November 2017, serves Trump's domestic political purposes. As a matter of principle, Trump does not apologize for his falsehoods.

Despite the frequency of Trump's falsehoods, the media rarely referred to them as "lies", a word that has in the past been avoided out of respect for the presidential office. Nevertheless, in August 2018 The Washington Post declared for the first time that some of Trump's misstatements (statements concerning hush money paid to Stormy Daniels and Playboy model Karen McDougal) were lies.

In 2020, Trump was a significant source of disinformation on national voting practices and the COVID-19 pandemic.  Trump's attacks on mail-in ballots and other election practices served to weaken public faith in the integrity of the 2020 presidential election, while his disinformation about the pandemic dangerously delayed and weakened the national response to it.

Some view the nature and frequency of Trump's falsehoods as having profound and corrosive consequences on democracy. James Pfiffner, professor of policy and government at George Mason University, wrote in 2019 that Trump lies differently from previous presidents, because he offers "egregious false statements that are demonstrably contrary to well-known facts"; these lies are the "most important" of all Trump lies. By calling facts into question, people will be unable to properly evaluate their government, with beliefs or policy irrationally settled by "political power"; this erodes liberal democracy, wrote Pfiffner.

Promotion of conspiracy theories 

Before and throughout his presidency, Trump has promoted numerous conspiracy theories, including "birtherism", the Clinton body count theory, QAnon and alleged Ukrainian interference in U.S. elections. In October 2020, Trump retweeted a QAnon follower who asserted that Osama bin Laden was still alive, a body double had been killed in his place and "Biden and Obama may have had Seal Team 6 killed."

Racial views 

Many of Trump's comments and actions have been seen as racially charged. He has repeatedly denied he is racist, asserting: "I am the least racist person there is anywhere in the world." Many of his supporters say the way he speaks reflects his rejection of political correctness, while others accept it because they share such beliefs. Scholars have discussed Trump's rhetoric in the context of white supremacy.

Several studies and surveys have found that racist attitudes fueled Trump's political ascendance and have been more important than economic factors in determining the allegiance of Trump voters. Racist and Islamophobic attitudes have been shown to be a powerful indicator of support for Trump. In national polling, about half of Americans say that Trump is racist; a greater proportion believe that he has emboldened racists.

In 1975, he settled a 1973 Department of Justice lawsuit that alleged housing discrimination against black renters. He has also been accused of racism for insisting a group of black and Latino teenagers were guilty of raping a white woman in the 1989 Central Park jogger case, even after they were exonerated by DNA evidence in 2002. He has maintained his position on the matter into 2019.

Trump relaunched his political career in 2011 as a leading proponent of "birther" conspiracy theories alleging that Barack Obama, the first black U.S. president, was not born in the United States. In April 2011, Trump claimed credit for pressuring the White House to publish the "long-form" birth certificate, which he considered fraudulent, and later saying this made him "very popular". In September 2016, amid pressure, he acknowledged that Obama was born in the U.S. and falsely claimed the rumors had been started by Hillary Clinton during her 2008 presidential campaign. In 2017, he reportedly still expressed birther views in private.

According to an analysis in Political Science Quarterly, Trump made "explicitly racist appeals to whites" during his 2016 presidential campaign. In particular, his campaign launch speech drew widespread criticism for claiming Mexican immigrants were "bringing drugs, they're bringing crime, they're rapists." His later comments about a Mexican-American judge presiding over a civil suit regarding Trump University were also criticized as racist.

Trump's comments in reaction to the 2017 Charlottesville far-right rally were interpreted by some as implying a moral equivalence between white supremacist demonstrators and counter-protesters.

In a January 2018 Oval Office meeting to discuss immigration legislation, he reportedly referred to El Salvador, Haiti, Honduras, and African nations as "shithole countries". His remarks were condemned as racist worldwide, as well as by many members of Congress.

In July 2019, Trump tweeted that four Democratic members of Congressall four minority women, three of them native-born Americansshould "go back" to the countries they "came from". Two days later the House of Representatives voted 240–187, mostly along party lines, to condemn his "racist comments". White nationalist publications and social media sites praised his remarks, which continued over the following days. Trump continued to make similar remarks during his 2020 campaign.

Misogyny and allegations of sexual assault and misconduct 

Trump has a history of insulting and belittling women when speaking to media and in tweet. He made lewd comments, demeaned women's looks, and called them names like 'dog', 'crazed, crying lowlife', 'face of a pig', or 'horseface'.

In October 2016, two days before the second presidential debate, a 2005 "hot mic" recording surfaced in which Trump was heard bragging about kissing and groping women without their consent, saying "when you're a star, they let you do it, you can do anything ... grab 'em by the pussy." The incident's widespread media exposure led to Trump's first public apology during the campaign and caused outrage across the political spectrum.

At least twenty-six women have publicly accused Trump of sexual misconduct , including his then-wife Ivana. There were allegations of rape, violence, being kissed and groped without consent, looking under women's skirts, and walking in on naked women. In 2016, he denied all accusations, calling them "false smears", and alleged there was a conspiracy against him.

Allegations of inciting violence

Some research suggests Trump's rhetoric causes an increased incidence of hate crimes. During the 2016 campaign, he urged or praised physical attacks against protesters or reporters. Since then, some defendants prosecuted for hate crimes or violent acts cited Trump's rhetoric in arguing that they were not culpable or should receive a lighter sentence. In August 2019 it was reported that a man who allegedly assaulted a minor for perceived disrespect toward the national anthem had cited Trump's rhetoric in his own defense. In August 2019, a nationwide review by ABC News identified at least 36 criminal cases in which Trump was invoked in direct connection with violence or threats of violence. Of these, 29 were based around someone echoing presidential rhetoric, while the other seven were someone protesting it or not having direct linkage.

Recognition 

In 1983, Trump received the Jewish National Fund Tree of Life Award, after he helped fund two playgrounds, a park, and a reservoir in Israel. In 1986, he received the Ellis Island Medal of Honor in recognition of "patriotism, tolerance, brotherhood and diversity", and in 1995 was awarded the President's Medal from the Freedoms Foundation for his support of youth programs. He has been awarded five honorary doctorates, but one was revoked by Robert Gordon University in 2015 after Trump called for a Muslim ban, citing Trump's speech being "wholly incompatible... with the ethos and values of the university". The remaining awards are Lehigh University's honorary doctorate of laws in 1988, Wagner College's honorary doctorate of humane letters in 2004, and Liberty University's honorary doctorates of business and law in 2012 and 2017 respectively.

In December 2016, Time named Trump as its "Person of the Year", but Trump took issue with the magazine for referring to him as the "President of the Divided States of America". In the same month, he was named Financial Times Person of the Year and was ranked by Forbes the second most powerful person in the world after Vladimir Putin. As president, Trump received the Collar of The Order of Abdulaziz al Saud from Saudi Arabia in 2017.

See also 
 Donald Trump in popular culture
 Every Second Counts (video contest)
 International reactions to the United States presidential election, 2016
 Make America Great Again
 Opinion polling on the Donald Trump administration
 Public image of Barack Obama

References 

Donald Trump
Trump
Articles containing video clips